Ferguson High School refers to several schools:

 Ferguson High School, Ratnapura
 Homer L. Ferguson High School, Virginia
Harold Ferguson High School, Colorado
John A. Ferguson High School, Florida
 Ferguson High School, operated from 1939–1962, Missouri. See McCluer High School.